An Australian Convention Travel Document (CTD) is a biometric refugee travel document issued for international travel purpose by the Australian Department of Foreign Affairs and Trade to individuals recognised as refugees residing in Australia under the 1951 Convention Relating to the Status of Refugees. The CTD enables the holder to leave Australia, to travel outside Australia (with limitations) and to re-enter Australia. However, as a CTD is not a regular national passport, some problems may be encountered by the holder from time to time, at time due to non-familiarity of airline staff.

Eligibility 
A holder of a permanent or temporary protection visa residing in Australia can apply for a CTD if he or she can demonstrate refugee status under the 1951 Convention and the 1967 Protocol Relating to the Status of Refugees.

Use 
Most countries accept Australian CTDs for visa issuance purposes, with the following exceptions:

As of 13 January 2016, Indonesia did not accept all non-passport documents including CTD for visa application.

It is also reported that Taiwan did not accept Chinese nationals holding Australian CTD to apply for Taiwanese visa.

Visa-free access or Visa-on-arrival 
Since Australian CTD is not a regular national passport, most countries and territories require visas prior to arrival.

The following countries and territories provide visa-free access or visa on arrival:

Asia

Europe

Oceania

See also 
 Australian Certificate of Identity
 Travel document

References 

International travel documents
Identity documents of Australia